Malik Muhammad Iqbal Channar is a Pakistani politician who was a Member of the Provincial Assembly of the Punjab, from 2002 to May 2018.

Early life and education
He was born on 15 March 1950 in Bahawalpur, Punjab.

He has the degree of Bachelor of Laws which he received in 1971 from Wilayat Hussain Islamia Law College in Multan.

Political career
He was elected to the Provincial Assembly of the Punjab as a candidate of Pakistan Muslim League (N) (PML-N) from Constituency PP-272 (Bahawalpur-VI) in 2002 Pakistani general election. He received 27,873 votes and defeated Zafar Iqbal, a candidate of Pakistan Peoples Party (PPP).

He was re-elected to the Provincial Assembly of the Punjab as a candidate of PML-N from Constituency PP-272 (Bahawalpur-VI) in 2008 Pakistani general election. He received 34,246 votes and defeated Ejaz Safdar, a candidate of Pakistan Muslim League (Q) (PML-Q). Following the election, he was inducted into the provincial Punjab cabinet of Chief Minister Shahbaz Sharif where he served as Provincial Minister of Punjab for Special Education from June 2008 until June 2010. In June 2010, he was appointed as the Provincial Minister of Punjab for Prisons.

He was re-elected to the Provincial Assembly of the Punjab as a candidate of PML-N from Constituency PP-272 (Bahawalpur-VI) in 2013 Pakistani general election. He received 40,409 votes and defeated Muhammad Asghar, a candidate of Pakistan Tehreek-e-Insaf (PTI). In June 2013, he was inducted into the provincial cabinet of Chief Minister Shahbaz Sharif and was made Provincial Minister of Punjab for Cooperatives.

References

1950 births
Living people
Saraiki people
Pakistan Muslim League (N) MPAs (Punjab)
Punjab MPAs 2002–2007
Punjab MPAs 2008–2013
Punjab MPAs 2013–2018